Estadio de la Cerámica, formerly and informally called El Madrigal, is a football stadium in Villarreal, Spain, used since 1923. It is currently the home venue of Villarreal CF of La Liga, the highest football league in Spain.

The stadium has 23,000 seats, a figure which is half the population of the city of Villarreal, making it the 26th-largest stadium in Spain and the 5th-largest in the Valencian Community.

History

The stadium was inaugurated on 17 June 1923 with a match between Castellón and Cervantes under the name Campo del Villarreal (Villarreal Field), becoming renamed two years later in honour to the rural lands on which it was erected.  Nicknamed the Feudo Amarillo ("Yellow Fief"), it is located at Plaza Labrador, ten kilometres away from the Mediterranean Sea, and at an altitude of 50 metres.

The first remodeling works took place on the stadium in the close season before the 1952–53 season. The size of the pitch was taken from 95 x 50 m to 104 x 65 m, matching that of the Helsinki Olympic Stadium of the 1952 Summer Olympics, a reference to copy during those years.

During the 1960s the club erected a small covered stand, and during the 1971–72 season the southern stands were finished. In 1988 it was demolished to make room for a new stand which opened on 8 March 1989 with a friendly match against Atlético Madrid.

For the club's 75th anniversary new renovation works were started. The south stand was again demolished to erect a new one with a roof, an amphitheatre, the VIP sector, and the northern stand were built, finishing the works at the 1999–2000 season. In the summer of 2001, the grandstand was enlarged.

The stadium was first floodlit for night matches on 16 September 1973 for the third division match between Villarreal and Ibiza. The city hall provided help for the construction of the floodlight towers located at each of the four corners of the field, with nine halogen lamps on top of each one.

The changing rooms were moved several times. Until the 1935–36 season they were at the south eastern corner of the stadium, then at the north east until 1989, when they were moved to the south western part. After the last modifications to the stadium, they are now under the main stand.

On 8 January 2017, just before a La Liga match against Barcelona, Villarreal changed the name of its stadium from El Madrigal to Estadio de la Cerámica recognising the local industry.

In February 2021, Norwegian club Molde FK played their Europa League last 32 home match at the ground, due to COVID-19 travel restrictions in their own country.

The "Casals Grocs"
There are 30 Casals Grocs VIP boxes with air conditioning, TV with live transmission of the matches, catering service, individual seats and independent access from the southern stand with three elevators. Of the 30 boxes, five accommodate 20 people, 23 accommodate 16, and the last two 12 fans.

Champions League
To be approved for the UEFA Champions League, stadiums have to fulfil a series of requisites, for which the Stadium had to be quickly renovated in 2005 to meet those regulations. The facade was covered with yellow tiles, both to improve aesthetics, and to benefit the local industry of tiles. The dressing rooms were also  renovated, creating an office for the coach, physiotherapy room, and a bath and showers area. There was also an office created for the UEFA delegates, an anti-doping hall, and the room for press conferences was expanded.

The separation of the pitch from the public has been expanded by one metre, and the entrance to the dressing rooms had to be revised. Two restaurants have been created inside the facilities, and the advertising system was computerised.

References

External links
El Madrigal at Villarrealcf.es
Estadios de Espana 

Villarreal CF
Multi-purpose stadiums in Spain
Football venues in the Valencian Community
Buildings and structures in the Province of Castellón
Sports venues completed in 1923
1923 establishments in Spain